Eileen Whelan (born 1964) is an Irish journalist, newsreader and presenter with Raidió Teilifís Éireann (RTÉ), Ireland's national radio and television station, where she has presented the One O'Clock News and Six One News as well as all other news bulletins on both radio and television.

Career
Whelan began her career as a newsreader for a radio station in her home town Wicklow and Dublin's Q102. She joined Raidió Teilifís Éireann (RTÉ), Ireland's national radio and television station in 1989 and presented RTÉ2's News on Two. Whelan relocated to London in 1997 where she worked as a newsreader for Sky News, BBC News and Independent Television News, before returning home to Ireland to become a news reporter for RTÉ News in 2000.

Whelan presents the One O'Clock News on weekdays and rotates between Ray Kennedy on weekends as a rotating anchor on the programme. She has also presented the Six One News as a relief presenter.

Personal life
Whelan is married to Larry Donnelly since 2009, a legal research lecturer at National University of Ireland, Galway (NUIG), and have two sons together, Seán and Larry Jr.

References

Irish women journalists
Irish women radio presenters
Living people
RTÉ newsreaders and journalists
1964 births
People from County Wicklow